Melkite Greek Catholic Archeparchy of Akka (in Arabic: أبرشية عكا وحيفا والناصرة وسائر الجليل للروم الملكيين الكاثوليك) is an Eastern Catholic diocese of Melkite Greek Catholic Church (Byzantine Rite, Arabic), directly subject to the Melkite Patriarch of Antioch. Its Cathedral episcopal see is St. Elijah Greek-Melkite Cathedral, in Haifa.

Territory and statistics 

The archeparchy extends its jurisdiction to Melkites of Israel, especially of Galilee. 
The headquarters of the archeparchy (archdiocese) is Haifa, where the Saint Elias Cathedral is located. The Melkite Greek Catholic Archeparchy of Akka counted 76,700 baptized members, and had a territory subdivided into 33 parishes in 2012.

As of 2014 the Melkite Greek Catholic Church was the largest Christian community in Israel, with roughly 60% of Israeli Christians belonging to the Melkite Greek Catholic Church.

The city of Haifa has the largest Melkite Greek Catholic community in Israel, followed by the cities of Nazareth and Shefa-Amr. Melkite Greek Catholics live in a number of other towns in Galilee either singly or mixed with Muslims, Druze and other Christian communities, such as Abu Snan, Arraba, Bi'ina, Daliyat al-Karmel, Deir Hanna, Eilabun, Hurfeish,  I'billin, Isfiya, Jadeidi-Makr, Jish, Kafr Kanna, Kafr Yasif, Kisra-Sumei, Maghar, Mazra'a, Muqeible, Peki'in, Rameh, Ras al-Ein, Reineh, Sakhnin, Shefa-Amr, Tur'an, Yafa an-Naseriyye and others have a presence of Melkite Greek Catholic communities too as do other mixed cities, especially Jerusalem and Tel Aviv-Jaffa, Ramleh, Lod, Acre, Nof HaGalil, and Ma'alot Tarshiha. It is reported that all the inhabitants of Fassuta and Mi'ilya are Melkite Christians.

History 
Ancient Ptolemais-Acre was visited by Paul of Tarsus during his trip described in chapter 21 of the Acts of Apostles. Soon, the city was a strong Christian community. In the third century was established headquarters of an ancient episcopal see here and the capital of the bishop of the diocese, which is suffragan of the Melkite Greek Catholic Archeparchy of Tyre, referring to the ancient period in Ptolemais in Phoenicia, called Acre in the Crusader period.

In 1753, the see was restored as a Melkite diocese by Patriarch Cyril VI Tanas and attached once again to Tyre, which had become independent from Jerusalem. However, the Melkite bishops of Acre began to reside there only in 1804.

Before 1932, the jurisdiction of Acre included Transjordan. The see became an Archeparchy on 18 November 1964 with the Papal Bull Apostolic constitution of Pope Paul VI and includes all Galilee.

List of episcopal ordinaries 
 Melkite Greek Catholic Eparchs (Bishops) of Akka
 Macaire Ajemi (1759 - 25 December 1774 resigned)
 Michel (Germanos) Adam (25 December 1774 consecrated - July 1777 appointed Archeparch of Aleppo)
 Makarios Fakhoury (? - 1794?)
 Makarios Nahas (1795 - 1809?)
 Habib Theodosius (1809 - 1833?)
 Michel Clement Bahouth, (B.S.) (10 August 1836 consecrated - 16 June 1856 confirmed as Patriarch of Antioch)
 Hanna (Gregory) Youssef-Sayour (13 November 1856 consecrated - 27 March 1865 confirmed as Patriarch of Antioch)
 Agapio Dumani, B.S. (4 December 1864 - 1893 deceased)
 Athanase Sabbagh (18 April 1894 - 2 June 1899 deceased)
 Grégoire Haggiar (24 March 1901 - 30 October 1940 deceased)
 Joseph Malouf, apostolic administrator (1940-1943)

 Melkite Greek Catholic Archeparchs (Archbishops) of Akka
 Georges Hakim (13 March 1943 – 26 November 1967), later Patriarch of Antioch of the Greek-Melkites (Syria)
 Joseph-Marie Raya (9 September 1968 - 21 August 1974 resigned), Titular Archbishop of Scythopolis (1974.08.21 – 2005.06.10)
 Maximos Salloum (20 August 1975 - 23 July 1997 withdrawn)
 Lutfi Laham, apostolic administrator (1997-1998)
 Pierre Mouallem,  (29 July 1998 - 18 July 2003 withdrawn)
 Georges Nicholas Haddad, apostolic administrator (21 March 2003 – 10 December 2005)
 Elias Chacour (7 February 2006 - 27 January 2014 withdrawn)
Moussa El-Hage, O.A.M., apostolic administrator (27 January 2014 – 21 June 2014)
 George Bacouni (21 June 2014 – 9 November 2018)
Fr. Andraus Bahus, apostolic administrator (24 November 2018 - March 2019)
  (since 18 March 2019)

See also 
 Catholic Church in Israel
 Latin Catholic Diocese of Acre
 Maronite Catholic Archeparchy of Haifa and the Holy Land

Notes

References

Sources and external links
 GigaCatholic, with incumbent biography links
 http://www.catholic-hierarchy.org/diocese/dakka.html
 http://catholicchurch-holyland.com/?p=246

Melkite Greek Catholic eparchies
Melkite Greek Catholic Church in Israel
Religion in Haifa
Acre, Israel